Scoparia declivis is a species of moth in the family Crambidae.  It is endemic to New Zealand.

Taxonomy

Scoparia declivis was described by Alfred Philpott in 1918. However the placement of this species within the genus Scoparia is in doubt. As a result, this species has also been referred to as Scoparia (s.l.) declivis.

Description

The wingspan is 28–32 mm. The forewings are fuscous-brown, irrorated with white. The basal area is pale up to the first line. This first line is whitish. The hindwings are pale whitish-ochreous. Adults have been recorded on wing in February.

References

Moths described in 1918
Moths of New Zealand
Scorparia
Endemic fauna of New Zealand
Endemic moths of New Zealand